is a Japanese manga series written and illustrated by Kenichi Sonoda. It was published in Kodansha's seinen manga magazine Monthly Afternoon from 1991 to 1997 and was followed between 2004 and 2008 by a sequel series Gunsmith Cats Burst which included the same characters and situations. The series describes the adventures of young women fighting crime in Chicago.

Plot

Nineteen-year-old Irene "Rally" Vincent operates the titular "Gunsmith Cats" gun shop but also works as a bounty hunter, which is the impetus behind many of the stories. She is assisted in both activities by her housemate, and former sex worker "Minnie" May Hopkins. Rally is an expert combat shooter and marksman with an array of weapons, as well as a brilliant driver. May is an explosives expert, knowing the inner workings of and many uses of all manner of explosive devices. Teenage ex-burglar and lock-picker Misty Brown later joins the team and there is also Becky Farrah, a top, if expensive, source of information on underworld activity.

Bounty hunting has of course led Rally to make many enemies, most notably Gray, the leader of gangsters whose use of armaments, including bombs, has likened them to terrorists; and Goldie Musou, a leading figure in the Mafia who uses drugs to manipulate people to the point that they can be brainwashed into killing their nearest and dearest. Bean Bandit, a man who specializes in delivering illegal goods, often features as an alternate ally or enemy—depending on the behavior of his clients, most of whom are being hunted by Rally.

Production
After leaving anime production company Artmic to work as a comic artist, Kenichi Sonoda presented some of his story concepts and illustrations to Kodansha. These did not impress the editors but an illustration of two girls caught the attention of one of them, who suggested Sonoda develop a concept for it. Sonoda stated in an interview that the drawing was the genesis for the series. At the time Sonoda did not have any plans for the illustration but decided to expand his Riding Bean concept into a developed story. Due to licensing issues, Sonoda was originally unable to use the Riding Bean concept or character around the time he was creating Gunsmith Cats. However, during the run of the series the rights were returned to him and he added Bean Bandit into the series. Although Sonoda was a fan of the Japanese police drama series Taiyō ni Hoero!, he decided the show did not fit his preferred Western style. The story is influenced by American gun-action movies such as The French Connection and The Blues Brothers.

Sonoda chose the Shelby GT500 as Rally's car after realising that the cars in driving movies from the 70s were often Ford Mustangs. He researched the various models and selected the GT500 because it was the most powerful rather than any attraction to the car itself. When drawing guns, Sonoda would use a combination of magazines and his own replicas.

Character names were taken from American TV shows such as Bewitched and The Fugitive. The character of Minnie-May was the result of a compromise between Sonoda and the publisher.

Media

Manga
Written and illustrated by Kenichi Sonoda, Gunsmith Cats began publication in the February 1991 issue of Afternoon, a monthly manga magazine published by Kodansha. The series ran for 76 chapters until the June 1997 issue of Afternoon. The complete series was published in 8 volumes between December 16, 1991 and July 23, 1997.

The series was adapted for publication in English by Studio Proteus and published by Dark Horse. Chapters were initially released as individual issues on a monthly basis from May 1, 1995 until August 15, 2001. Their release completely removed a scene where Minnie May performs oral sex on a man and another had blood stains on a bed removed, this censorship was done with the approval of Kenichi Sonoda. The individual chapters were then collected into 9 trade paperback volumes between October 1, 1996 and February 13, 2002. The series began serialisation in the British magazine Manga Mania from September 1996.

A four-volume omnibus edition of the series, Gunsmith Cats Revised Edition was published in Japan between July 22, 2005 and October 21, 2005. The fourth volume includes the manga and "making of" materials of Riding Bean and Sonoda's early sketches and notes. This edition was then published in English by Dark Horse between March 14, 2007 and December 19, 2007. The English edition used the original Japanese format of reading from right to left for the first time in its English publication. It was sold shrink-wrapped and with an 18+ Mature warning on the cover.
 
A sequel Gunsmith Cats Burst was later released. Five volumes were released in Japan between June 23, 2005 and November 21, 2008. The English edition was published by Dark Horse between May 2, 2007 and April 14, 2010.

Anime
A three-part anime adaptation was created. This adaptation is an original story for the characters but includes several references to the manga storyline.

The OVA was licensed by ADV Films (currently known as Sentai Filmworks) who released the first episode in North America on February 20, 1996. There was a choice of either subtitled or dubbed VHS, as well as a bilingual Laserdisc. A special edition was also released of the subtitled version, along with a 40-minute making of documentary. ADV then chose the series for their first release in the United Kingdom. The first volume was released on June 3, 1996 as subtitled or dubbed VHS and also included the documentary.

A DVD release of all 3 episodes and the making of special was released in North America on March 27, 2001 before being rereleased as part of ADV's "Essential" range with a lower price on April 13, 2004.

On December 3, 2017, AnimEigo announced that they acquired the license for Gunsmith Cats, and that they will host a Kickstarter campaign to produce a Blu-ray edition for the series. The Blu-ray shipped in 2019, with AnimEigo announcing that "the Gunsmith Cats Explosive Edition Kickstarter was our most successful yet."

The anime adaptation was directed by Takeshi Mori. Although Mori was interested in cars, he had no knowledge of guns and had made an effort to research them for the production. He made sure the story was interesting to prevent the anime from focusing only on the guns and cars. The music for the anime was composed by former Weather Report drummer, Peter Erskine. During production of the anime adaptation, members of the staff made several trips to Chicago to scout locations, including visits to a Gun Shop and a Police Academy. During these trips the staff were able to handle and fire real guns for research, something not possible in Japan with its gun laws. A Shelby Cobra GT-500 was recorded in Hollywood for sound effects purposes, and almost all of the other sound effects were recorded using Foley.

The anime adaptation was broadcast on the Encore Action Channel in September 2000.

The series was also referenced in the Nintendo 3DS game Project X Zone 2.

Reception
The series was nominated in the "Best American Adaptation of Foreign material" category of the 1997 Harvey Award.

In Manga: The Complete Guide, Jason Thompson is critical of Sonoda's depiction of women as "thin-hipped plastic toys with pubic hair" and some "frankly pedophilic" plot elements. However, he praises the "skilled storytelling" and describes the English localisation as "excellent".

Mike Crandol of Anime News Network was critical of the final volume Misty's Run, believing the previous volume would have been a better end and the "true climax" to the series. He highlights a lower quality of art in comparison to earlier volumes as a sign that Sonoda may have been losing interest in the series. However he notes that despite this, the story is still "smartly executed and action packed".

Manga Mania described the anime adaption as "colourful, crazy stuff" and "a highly enjoyable feast". Comparing the manga and anime they noted that despite Sonoda's attention to the cars and weapons in the series, the setting feels more like a generic American town than Chicago. However they praised the attention given to the anime adaption's more accurate portrayal of the city. In The Anime Encyclopedia, Jonathan Clements and Helen McCarthy call the adaption "good fun" and observed the lighthearted approach to the series in comparison to the manga. They believe it deserved a version for TV. However they conclude that the low demand for pulp crime in the 1990s was a problem.

Mike Crandol of Anime News Network was largely positive about the anime adaption but noted the simplified gunplay compared to the manga. He praised the attention ADV paid to the DVD package compared to their other titles and the quality of the English dub. In summary he called the anime adaption "an excellent introductory piece of anime" due to the familiarity of the setting for those new to anime and called the adaption a "solid piece of fun filmmaking". In another review on the Anime News Network, a reviewer praised the series for looking and sounding "like a gritty, grey suburb of modern Chicago," the impressive quality of the anime, action, and artwork. Raphael See of THEM Anime Reviews praised the series for delivering on "much of what its manga predecessor offers," having a "fairly intelligent story, smooth animation, furious action, and continued humor". He only complained that the series is too short, hoping that more will later be in production.

References

External links

Gunsmith Cats
1995 anime OVAs
Adventure anime and manga
ADV Films
Comics set in Chicago
Crime in anime and manga
Dark Horse Comics titles
Fiction about bomb disposal
Fictional portrayals of the Chicago Police Department
Fictional bounty hunters
Girls with guns anime and manga
Kodansha manga
OLM, Inc.
Seinen manga